Igel is a surname. Notable people with the surname include:

Daisy Igel (born 1926/1927), Brazilian architect and billionaire heiress
Ernesto Igel (1893–1966), Austrian businessman
Fritz Igel (1898-unknown), Austrian chess player and writer
Nick Igel (born 1972), American soccer player
Pery Igel (1921–1998), Brazilian businessman
Stacy Igel, American fashion designer
Wolf von Igel (1888–?), alleged spy for Germany during WWI